Olha Shliakhova (born 8 April 1976) is a Ukrainian basketball player. She competed in the women's tournament at the 1996 Summer Olympics.

References

1976 births
Living people
Ukrainian women's basketball players
Olympic basketball players of Ukraine
Basketball players at the 1996 Summer Olympics
Sportspeople from Kharkiv